Acanthennea erinacea is a species of air-breathing land snail, terrestrial pulmonate gastropod mollusk in the family Streptaxidae.

Acanthennea erinacea is the only species within the genus Acanthennea.

Distribution 
Acanthennea erinacea is endemic to Silhouette Island and Mahé Island, the Seychelles.

References

Streptaxidae
Gastropods described in 1898
Endemic fauna of Seychelles